General elections were held in Honduras on 10 October 1948. The elections were boycotted by the Liberal Party as the party was restricted from campaigning. Instead, they called for the electorate to abstain from voting.

Results

President

Congress

References

Bibliography
Argueta, Mario.  Tiburcio Carías: anatomía de una época, 1923-1948.  Tegucigalpa: Editorial Guaymuras. 1989.  
Bardales B., Rafael. Historia del Partido Nacional de Honduras. Tegucigalpa: Servicopiax Editores. 1980.
Elections in the Americas A Data Handbook Volume 1. North America, Central America, and the Caribbean. Edited by Dieter Nohlen. 2005.
Euraque, Darío A. Reinterpreting the banana republic: region and state in Honduras, 1870-1972. Chapel Hill: The University of North Carolina Press. 1996.
Krehm, William.  Democracia y tiranias en el Caribe.  Buenos Aires: Editorial Parnaso.  (First edition in 1947). 1957.  
Leonard, Thomas M.  “The quest for Central American democracy since 1945.”  Assessing democracy in Latin America.  1998.  Boulder: Westview Press.
Parker, Franklin D. The Central American republics. Westport: Greenwood Press. Reprint of 1964 original. 1981.
Political handbook of the world 1948. New York, 1949.
Posas, Mario and Rafael del Cid. La construcción del sector público y del estado nacional en Honduras (1876-1979). San José: EDUCA. Second edition. 1983.
Rojas Bolaños, Manuel.  “La política.”  Historia general de Centroamérica.  1994.  San José: FLACSO.  Volume five1994.  
Stokes, William S.  Honduras: an area study in government.  Madison: University of Wisconsin Press. 1950.  
Weaver, Frederick Stirton. Inside the volcano: the history and political economy of Central America. Boulder: Westview Press. 1994. 

Elections in Honduras
Honduras
General election
Presidential elections in Honduras
Honduran general election
Election and referendum articles with incomplete results